The barbed brotula (Selachophidium guentheri) is a species of cusk-eel found in the Indian and Atlantic Oceans off of the southern coast of Africa where it is found at depths of from .  This species grows to a length of  TL.  This species is the only known member of its genus.

References

Ophidiidae
Monotypic fish genera
Marine fauna of Southern Africa
barbed brotula